The County of Buln Buln is one of the 37 counties of Victoria which are part of the cadastral divisions of Australia, used for land titles. It was first proclaimed in government gazette on 24 Feb 1871 together with others from the Gipps Land District. It includes Wilsons Promontory, and the Victorian coast from around Venus Bay in the west to Lake Wellington in the east. Sale is near its north-eastern edge. Some time earlier maps showed proposed counties of Bass, Douro, and part of Haddington and Bruce occupying the area of Buln Buln.

Parishes 
Parishes include:
 Alberton East, Victoria
 Alberton West, Victoria
 Allambee, Victoria
 Allambee East, Victoria
 Balloong, Victoria
 Beek Beek, Victoria
 Binginwarri, Victoria
 Boodyarn, Victoria
 Booran, Victoria
 Bruthen, Victoria
 Budgeree, Victoria
 Bulga, Victoria
 Callignee, Victoria
 Carrajung, Victoria
 Coolungoolun, Victoria
 Darnum, Victoria
 Darriman, Victoria
 Devon, Victoria
 Doomburrim, Victoria
 Drouin East, Victoria
 Drouin West, Victoria
 Drumdlemara, Victoria
 Dulungalong, Victoria
 Dumbalk, Victoria
 Ellinging, Victoria
 Fumina, Victoria
 Giffard, Victoria
 Glencoe, Victoria
 Glencoe South, Victoria
 Gunyah Gunyah, Victoria
 Hazelwood, Victoria
 Holey Plains, Victoria
 Jeeralang, Victoria
 Jindivick, Victoria
 Jumbuk, Victoria
 Kirrak, Victoria
 Koorooman, Victoria
 Korumburra, Victoria
 Kulk, Victoria
 Leongatha, Victoria
 Longford, Victoria
 Longwarry, Victoria
 Loy Yang, Victoria
 Mardan, Victoria
 Maryvale, Victoria
 Meeniyan, Victoria
 Mirboo, Victoria
 Mirboo North, Victoria
 Moe, Victoria
 Morwell, Victoria
 Mullungdung, Victoria
 Narracan, Victoria
 Narracan South, Victoria
 Nayook, Victoria
 Nayook West, Victoria
 Neerim, Victoria
 Neerim East, Victoria
 Nerrena, Victoria
 Noojee, Victoria
 Noojee East, Victoria
 Poowong, Victoria
 Poowong East, Victoria
 Rosedale, Victoria
 Seacombe, Victoria
 Snake Island (Victoria)
 St Margaret, Victoria
 Stradbroke, Victoria
 Sunday Island (Victoria)
 Tallang, Victoria
 Tarra Tarra, Victoria
 Tarwin, Victoria
 Tarwin South, Victoria
 Tong Bong, Victoria
 Toora, Victoria
 Toorongo, Victoria
 Traralgon, Victoria
 Waratah, Victoria
 Waratah North, Victoria
 Warragul, Victoria
 Warren, Victoria
 Welshpool, Victoria
 Willung, Victoria
 Wonga Wonga, Victoria
 Wonga Wonga South, Victoria
 Wonwron, Victoria
 Wonyip, Victoria
 Woodside, Victoria
 Woorarra, Victoria
 Woranga, Victoria
 Wull Wullock, Victoria
 Yanakie, Victoria
 Yanakie South, Victoria
 Yarragon, Victoria
 Yarram, Victoria
 Yinnar, Victoria

See also 
 List of reduplicated Australian place names

References 
 Vicnames, place name details
 Research aids, Victoria 1910
    Map of the counties of Evelyn, Tanjil, Buln-Buln. John Sands, 1886. National Library of Australia

Counties of Victoria (Australia)